David Irving (born 1938) is a British Holocaust denier and writer .

David Irving may also refer to:
David Irving (director), American film director, screenwriter, author, and professor 
David Irving (librarian) (1778–1860), Scottish biographer
David Irving (footballer) (born 1951), English former football player
David Irving (bishop), Bishop of Saskatoon
David P. Irving (1841–1922), farmer and political figure in Prince Edward Island, Canada
Dan Irving (1854–1924), David Daniel Irving, British member of parliament
David Irving (American football) (born 1993), NFL defensive lineman

See also
David Irvine (disambiguation)
David Irwin (disambiguation)